Fern Township is a township in Hubbard County, Minnesota, United States. The population was 209 at the 2000 census. Fern Township was named for Fern Smith, the daughter of Seth Smith, an early homesteader.

Geography

Township history
The township of Fern was surveyed in 1879 and organized jointly with Lake Hattie Township on August 6, 1898. The first homesteaders in the township were Seth Smith in May 1896 and Lars Lind, who filed in the fall of 1896. The Becida store and post office was established in 1899 and operated by Christen A. Olson and Even K. Nyhus. Olson and Nyhus were brothers-in-law, their wives being sisters Christi and Anna Haugan.

The original school opened in 1899, with Cora Crawford the first teacher, who went on to become Hubbard County superintendent of schools. Brothers Even K. and Knute Nyhus each gave an acre of farmland for the Fern Township Cemetery.

The first officials of Fern Township included: 
E.O. Howe; Clerk
Lars Lind; Treasurer
Christen A. Olson and Seth Smith; Justices of the peace
Seth Smith and Louis E. Hanson; Constables
Christen A. Olson; Postmaster

Demographics
As of the census of 2000, there were 209 people, 79 households, and 54 families residing in the township.  The population density was 5.9 people per square mile (2.3/km2).  There were 109 housing units at an average density of 3.1/sq mi (1.2/km2).  The racial makeup of the township was 99.04% White and 0.96% Native American.

There were 79 households, out of which 34.2% had children under the age of 18 living with them, 58.2% were married couples living together, 7.6% had a female householder with no husband present, and 30.4% were non-families. 21.5% of all households were made up of individuals, and 5.1% had someone living alone who was 65 years of age or older.  The average household size was 2.65 and the average family size was 3.20.

In the township the population was spread out, with 26.8% under the age of 18, 9.1% from 18 to 24, 31.1% from 25 to 44, 26.3% from 45 to 64, and 6.7% who were 65 years of age or older.  The median age was 38 years. For every 100 females, there were 106.9 males.  For every 100 females age 18 and over, there were 104.0 males.

The median income for a household in the township was $41,000, and the median income for a family was $43,333. Males had a median income of $32,083 versus $21,406 for females. The per capita income for the township was $14,764.  About 3.3% of families and 5.7% of the population were below the poverty line, including none of those under the age of eighteen or sixty five or over.

References

Townships in Hubbard County, Minnesota
Townships in Minnesota